, is a Japanese actress from Kagoshima Prefecture. She is part of the Kagoshima University of Students Music Academy and is currently a member of agency Sun Music Artist Academy. Her older sister is Chiaki Saitō, who is also an actress.

Television drama 
Mito Kōmon - Aki (parts 31-37, October 14, 2002 - September 17, 2007, TBS)
Nejireta Kizuna  - Young Makoto Isoda (April 2004, TBS)
Ue o Muite Arukō: Sakamoto Kyu Monogatari - Young Yachiyo Endō (August 21, 2005, TV Tokyo)
Chōnan no Kekkon - Hanayome wa Batsu Ichi! Toshiue! Komichi!? - Rika Ōyama (February 3, 2008, TV Asahi)

Stage acting 
Performance Dance Studio (November 2002, May 2003)
Miyako Harumi Special Performance "Come to Love / 2008 Miyako Harumi Singing" (Shinjuku Koma Theater, March 4–20)

References

External links 
 Official agency profile 

1995 births
Japanese child actresses
Living people
People from Kagoshima Prefecture
Japanese television actresses
Japanese stage actresses
21st-century Japanese actresses